Histidinuria-renal tubular defect syndrome is a rare genetic disorder characterized by histidinuria associated with the intestines' and the renal tubule's impaired ability of absorbing histidine. Additional findings include intellectual disability, developmental delay, epilepsy, and mild congenital variations. Only five cases (all male) from four families have been described in medical literature.

References 

Syndromes affecting the kidneys
Rare genetic syndromes